Daria Vladimirovna Morozova (born in Moscow 22 January 1997) is a Russian competitive ice dancer. With former partner Mikhail Zhirnov, she is the 2014 JGP Slovenia champion.

Career 
Morozova started skating in 2001. She began competing with Mikhail Zhirnov in the 2008–09 season. The two were coached by Svetlana Liapina before they switched to Alexander Svinin and Irina Zhuk. 

Representing Russia, Morozova/Zhirnov made their junior international debut in November 2010 at the NRW Trophy. In September 2011, they placed fifth at their first ISU Junior Grand Prix (JGP) assignment, in Riga, Latvia. In the 2012–13 JGP season, they ranked fourth in Lake Placid, New York before winning bronze in Chemnitz, Germany. They finished fourth at the 2013 Russian Junior Championships. 

Morozova/Zhirnov took bronze at both of their 2013–14 JGP events, in Minsk, Belarus and Tallinn, Estonia, and came in sixth at the 2014 Russian Junior Championships.

Their first assignment of the 2014–15 JGP series took place in Ljubljana, Slovenia. Placing first in the short dance and third in the free dance, they won the gold medal by a margin of 0.24 over Canada's Brianna Delmaestro / Timothy Lum. They placed fourth at the JGP in Zagreb, Croatia and qualified for the ISU Junior Grand Prix Final, where they finished sixth. After withdrawing from the 2015 Russian Junior Championships, Morozova/Zhirnov ended their partnership.

Programs 
(with Zhirnov)

Competitive highlights 
JGP: Junior Grand Prix

With Zhirnov

References

External links 

 

1997 births
Russian female ice dancers
Living people
Figure skaters from Moscow